Electromerism is a type of isomerism between a pair of molecules (electromers, electro-isomers) differing in the way electrons are distributed among the atoms and the connecting chemical bonds. In some literature electromerism is equated to valence tautomerism, a term usually reserved for tautomerism involving reconnecting chemical bonds.

One group of electromers are excited electronic states but isomerism is usually limited to ground state molecules. Another group of electromers are also called redox isomers: metal ions that can exchange their oxidation state with their ligands (see non-innocent ligand). One of the first instances was a cobalt bis(quinone) complex described by Buchanan and Pierpont in 1980  with a cobalt(II) complex in chemical equilibrium with the cobalt(III) complex. Ligands commonly found are based on dioxolenes, phenoxyl radicals and polychlorotriphenylmethyl radicals. Metalloporphyrins have also been studied. A set of electromers not requiring redox-active ligands have been described  as well as a set without a metal. A new group of electromers has also been described recently.

References

Isomerism